Sinful Davey is a 1969 picaresque adventure/ crime/ comedy film directed by John Huston and starring John Hurt, Pamela Franklin, and in early appearances Fionnula Flanagan and Anjelica Huston.

John Huston later said the film was "very good" but "spoiled beyond recognition" by the producers.

Plot 
In a British prison in the early 1800s, Scottish rogue Davey Haggart (John Hurt) is seen writing his memoirs while waiting to be hanged.  Most of his story is told in flashback with voice-over narration by Davey.  His story begins as he is seen marching and beating a drum for the British Army, but he quickly deserts by jumping off a bridge with his drum and floating away.  We learn that his father had been a highwayman who was hanged at the age of 21 for attempting to rob the Duke of Argyll (Robert Morley) and that Davey is determined to exceed the number of his father's crimes.  Annie (Pamela Franklin), a childhood friend who is in love with him, follows him at different times, sometimes getting him out of trouble but hoping that he will reform.

Davey winds up becoming a partner with McNab (Ronald Fraser), a pickpocket and thief, sometimes teaming up with other criminals.  Eventually, the two land in prison, where Davey is able to break into the women's quarters and start a raucous party with the female prisoners, led by Jean Carlisle (Fidelma Murphy).  Davey is bailed out by Annie, but he then enables McNab's escape and turns to highway robbery, following in his father's footsteps.  Constable Richardson (Nigel Davenport), the local officer, tries to recruit Annie to help capture Davey, but she refuses.

Davey goes into hiding in the Scottish highlands, but still gets into trouble.  Almost by accident, Davey foils an attempted assault and robbery of Sir James Graham (Donal McCann), a nephew of the Duke of Argyll, who invites Davey to his uncle's manor.  While Davey wins the favor of the Duke and his family, McNab, Jean Carlisle, Annie, and Constable Richardson also converge on the estate at different times.  Davey sets up an elaborate robbery of guests at a grand ball hosted by the Duchess (Maxine Audley), but Annie then returns the stolen jewels.  When Richardson recognizes Davey as the thief he has been seeking, a lengthy chase ensues, with Davey stealing a horse and riding away until he is knocked off by a low-hanging tree branch.

The story returns to Davey's prison cell, as he finishes writing his memoirs, expecting his execution to take place soon.  Annie and McNab, however, are able to sabotage the gallows so that Davey escapes once again, riding away with Annie.

Production

Director John Huston and producer Walter Mirisch clashed several times during and after the film's production, especially in regard to a musical score originally composed by John Barry, the casting of Huston's daughter Anjelica, and the final editing of the film. Critic David Sterrit describes the final product as "a box-office fiasco that nobody has particularly wanted to own. But it's also an interesting document from Huston's tired period, showing what can happen when a great director and a major studio clash over a project that was probably fated from the beginning not to click."

The film is based on the autobiography of David Haggart titled The Life of David Haggart. The film, about a Scottish rogue, was filmed in Ireland, and much of the cast have Irish accents instead of the more accurate Scottish accent.

Four members of the film unit making the picture in Co. Wicklow crashed in their Cessna plane at Glenmalure in 1967. All the occupants of the plane were injured to some extent, but John O’Connor, the location manager, was the most seriously injured. Huston left the film location to visit the hospital and stopped the filming.

Cast
 John Hurt as Davey Haggart
 Pamela Franklin as Annie
 Nigel Davenport as Richardson
 Ronald Fraser as MacNab
 Robert Morley as Duke of Argyll
 Fidelma Murphy as Jean Carlisle
 Maxine Audley as Duchess of Argyll
 Fionnula Flanagan as Penelope
 Donal McCann as Sir James Campbell
 Allan Cuthbertson as Captain Douglas
 Eddie Byrne as Yorkshire Bill
 Niall MacGinnis as Boots Simpson
 Noel Purcell as Jock
 Judith Furse as Mary
 Francis de Wolff as Andrew
 Paul Farrell as Bailiff

Critical reception
TV Guide says- "A good cast overcomes the somewhat heavy-handed direction of Huston in this Tom Jones-inspired comedy".

References

External links
Sinful Davey at Rotten Tomatoes
 sung by Esther Ofarim
 
 

1969 films
1960s English-language films
1960s crime comedy films
1960s adventure comedy films
American adventure comedy films
American crime comedy films
British adventure comedy films
Films directed by John Huston
Films set in Scotland
Films shot in Ireland
United Artists films
British crime comedy films
1969 comedy films
Films scored by Ken Thorne
1960s American films
1960s British films